Prasophyllum odoratum, commonly known as the fragrant leek orchid, Rogers scented leek orchid or sweet leek orchid is a species of orchid endemic to south-eastern Australia. It has a single tubular leaf and up to fifty fragrant green and white flowers with reddish marks.

Description
The flowers are green and white with reddish marks and are scented. As with others in the genus, the flowers are inverted so that the labellum is above the column rather than below it. Flowering occurs from October to January.

Taxonomy and naming
Prasophyllum odoratum was first formally described in 1909 by Richard Sanders Rogers and the description was published in Transactions, proceedings and report, Royal Society of South Australia. The specific epithet (odoratum) is a Latin word meaning "having a smell" or "fragrant".

Distribution and habitat
The fragrant leek orchid grows in a wide range of habitats in New South Wales as far inland as Griffith and is widespread in Victoria.

References

External links 
 

odoratum
Flora of New South Wales
Flora of Victoria (Australia)
Endemic orchids of Australia
Plants described in 1909
Taxa named by Richard Sanders Rogers